Siegfried II may refer to:

Siegfried II, Count of Stade (d. 1037)
Siegfried II (archbishop of Mainz) (d. 1230)
Siegfried II of Westerburg (d. 1297), archbishop of Cologne
Siegfried II of Querfurt (d. 1310), bishop of Hildesheim